Virreyes is a town located in the San Fernando Partido of Buenos Aires Province, Argentina. It forms part of the Greater Buenos Aires urban conurbation.

See also 
 San Fernando Partido

Populated places in Buenos Aires Province
San Fernando Partido